WRGY (90.5 FM) is a radio station licensed to Rangeley, Maine, United States.  The station is currently owned by Tranet, a non-profit organization operated by Bill and Margaret Ellis.  The station has studios on Main Street in Rangeley with transmitter atop Saddleback Mountain.

See also
List of community radio stations in the United States

References

External links
 

RGY
Radio stations established in 2010
Franklin County, Maine
Community radio stations in the United States
2010 establishments in Maine